The men's team pursuit competition at the 2022 European Speed Skating Championships was held on 7 January 2022.

Results
The race was started at 19:09.

References

Men's team pursuit